The Reformation in Economics is a book written by the Irish economist Philip Pilkington. It is a book that aims to deconstruct contemporary neoclassical economic theory in order to determine to what extent it is scientific and to what extent it is ideological. The book is divided into three sections: Ideology and Methodology, Stripped-Down Macroeconomics and Approaching the Real World. The first section of the book engages in a deconstruction of economic theory that seeks to weed out the ideological elements of economic theory while introducing a coherent methodology that allows for the reconstruction that follows. The second section lays out a theory of the macroeconomy that builds on the methodology described in the first section and tackles: money, prices, profits, income distribution, income determination, investment and finance. The final section sketches out how such a theory should be applied to real-world empirical data, with a particular emphasis on the fact that working economists are faced with fundamental uncertainty and so applying their theories is not as simple or straightforward as applying theories in the hard sciences, like physics.

Themes

Economics and Ideology

The author considers a lot of contemporary neoclassical economic theory to be ideology. In an article that accompanied the release of the book, Pilkington compared neoclassical economics to the 19th century ideological pseudoscience of phrenology:

 "What made phrenology so popular was what also made economics so popular at the time: it gave a rationale for a society based on Progress and also provided a blueprint for how this could be achieved. The phrenological doctrine, being so vague in its pronouncements, was highly malleable and could be used to justify whatever those in power needed justifying. So, for example, in 19th century England phrenology was used to justify laissez faire economic policies by emphasising unequal natural capacities amongst the population while in early 20th century Belgian Rwanda it was used to justify the supposed superiority of the Tutsis over the Hutus. In my book The Reformation in Economics I take the position that modern economics is more similar to phrenology than it is to, say, physics."

The book seeks to show that much of the ideology in economics is due to microeconomics and attempts made by economists to try to understand the behaviour of individuals based on fixed and unchanging laws. Pilkington argues that only macroeconomics, which deals with large aggregates of people, can allow for the abstraction necessary to generate scientific statements about the economics.

Epistemology, Modelling and Bias

Pilkington argues that economists do not actually understand what they are doing when they build economic models. He argues that this is because economists have no coherent epistemology. In order to ground economics in a proper epistemology and render it useful and clear he draws on the work of the philosophers George Berkeley and Immanuel Kant. He argues that economics should move away from models altogether and toward a form of schematism as outlined in the philosophy of Kant. He also argues that since economists deal with abstractions they must be careful in order to ensure that their theories remain close to reality.

The book also argues that disciplines like economics can be subject to extreme biases that can have a highly negative impact on both theory and empirical studies. Pilkington writes that the reason for this is that economic studies cannot provide repeatable controlled experiments and so they can reach extremely biased results. In order to counter this he claims that economists should be aware of their biases and lays out a theory of bias in science to help elucidate this.

Equilibrium

The book also argues that there are many different conceptions of equilibrium in economics but that most economists are not aware of this. For this reason economists often do not understand how their theory applies to reality. Based on this Pilkington argues against the Walrasian conception of a general equilibrium as is used in most economics models. He makes this case on the basis of his epistemological realism.

The Efficient Markets Hypothesis

In the book the author argues that the efficient-market hypothesis (EMH) theory of financial markets is not only wrong but not even a theory. He lays out an argument that the theory is not a theory at all but rather a tautological fallacy that arises out of a confusion between statistical averages and single investors. He makes the case that the whole theory rests on an implicit view of successful investors as simply lucky, but if this same criteria were applied to successful members of any other profession, the statement would be readily seen as absurd.

Uncertainty and Probability

Pilkington argues that economics and any disciplines that deal with historical data rather than repeatable controlled experiments deal with material that is fundamentally uncertain. Such material can never be assumed to adhere to fixed laws in the way that, say, chemistry and physics can be thought to adhere to fixed laws. Neoclassical economists and econometricians evade this by claiming that economic and historical processes are characterised by known probability distributions. But Pilkington shows that this is impossible because economic and historical processes are open, not closed systems and so rather than dealing with a series of bounded probabilities we in fact deal with a series of unbounded possibilities.

The author lays out some guidelines for how such material should and should not be dealt with in both theory and in practice. He highlights the British economist Wynne Godley's approach which he refers to as the "unsustainable processes" approach as a novel and robust way to deal with uncertain, open systems material. This methodology seeks to locate economic processes that are unsustainable so that the economist can make a prediction that they will come to an end. Such an approach is not forecasting, as no exact date is given and no attempt at predicting specific variables is undertaken. Pilkington argues that this is the best approach to such open systems material.

Macroeconomic Theory

In addition to these broad themes, a good deal of the book is concerned with laying out an alternative, "stripped-down" theory of the macroeconomy. This theory rests on the kaleidostatics approach of the British economist G.L.S. Shackle. Pilkington formulates much of this theory in mathematical terms but does so in such a way that it remains an open systems approach. The theory that results is closely linked to the Post-Keynesian school of economic thought.

Interest Rates

In the book Pilkington lays out a novel theory of interest rate determination. In contrast to neoclassical and even Keynesian theories of the interest rate as primarily a price for money, Pilkington argues that the interest rate at the most basic level is determined by the relative social powers of creditors and debtors. This relationship is mediated by historically contingent legal and economic institutions, like the central banks, which subordinate creditor power to the whims of governments, courts and technocrats. It is only based on these fundamentally-determined interest rates that the price mechanism comes into play.

Reviews

In the Financial Times, journalist Martin Sandbu wrote that Pilkington "usefully revisits forgotten writers from the history of economic thought but insists a little too rashly that they alone were right and the entire direction the field took instead was misguided. He correctly points out the dangers of mathematising economic argument - but somewhat undermines his point by introducing equations of his own."

In the Irish Times Cillian Doyle wrote that Pilkington "dispenses with such appeals by making his pitch to the next generation, those who are currently cutting their teeth in undergraduate or postgraduate courses" and that he sees "economics as ripe for the kind of transformation experienced by religion half a millennia ago and with the same irreverence that Martin Luther once besieged the Church". Doyle writes that Pilkington has provided a basis on which the student movements protesting the current curriculum can build.

In the journal American Affairs, economist Marc Morgan writes that the book "is a deeply informed, lucid, and concise critique of the edifice and history of the current dominant economics paradigm—what the author refers to as “marginalist economics”—coupled with a foundational reconstruction from first principles, “a firm grounding, a shrub that can, given time, grow into something far more robust.” It is a bold task, but one the author largely accomplishes with great precision, and more importantly, pedagogy. Its depth comes from its excursions into other fields of epistemological inquiry."

References

 Pilkington, Philip (2016). The Reformation in Economics: A Deconstruction and Reconstruction of Economic Theory. Palgrave Macmillan.

2016 non-fiction books
Economics books
Palgrave Macmillan books